Joseph Mario Jacques Olivier, PC (born April 14, 1944) is a Canadian politician, businessman and labour leader. He was mayor of Longueuil, Quebec, from 2001 until 2005 and is a former Member of Parliament.

Background and early career

A hospital worker in his youth, Olivier was elected president of the trade union local at Charles-LeMoyne Hospital and treasurer of Quebec's National Federation of Hospital Employees. In 1970, Prime Minister Pierre Trudeau appointed Olivier as an aide to the Canadian Cabinet on labour relations.

Election to Federal Parliament and Federal political role

In the 1972 election, Olivier was elected to the House of Commons of Canada as the Liberal Member of Parliament for the riding of Longueuil. He served as parliamentary secretary to the Minister of Labour from 1976 to 1978.

Following the 1980 election, Olivier was elected chair of the Liberal Party's Quebec caucus. In January 1984, Trudeau appointed Olivier to the Cabinet as Minister of State for fitness and amateur sport. Olivier was dropped from Cabinet in June when John Turner became the new prime minister. He was defeated in the subsequent 1984 election.

Business associations

Following his defeat, Olivier established a Ford dealership in Saint-Hubert, Quebec, and soon joined the board of directors of the Corporation des concessionnaires automobiles du Grand Montréal et du Québec.

Longueuil municipal politics

In 1987, he ran to be mayor of Longueuil, but was defeated. He was elected mayor of the Montreal suburb in 2001, and serves as vice-chairman of the executive committee of the Montreal Metropolitan Community. During the Quebec municipal restructuring of 2002, Olivier became Mayor of the new Mega-city of Longueuil which merged the former cities of Longueuil, Boucherville, Brossard and Saint-Lambert; towns of Greenfield Park, LeMoyne, Saint-Bruno-de-Montarville and Saint-Hubert. This merger was partially reversed after municipal referendums and was seen by many to be a failure on Olivier's part to sell the new Mega-City. Olivier led his own municipal political party, équipe Olivier, which held a large majority on Longueuil's city council.

Olivier did not run in the 2005 municipal election and was succeeded as mayor by Claude Gladu.

Electoral record (incomplete)

External links

Olivier Ford (official website)

1944 births
French Quebecers
Liberal Party of Canada MPs
Living people
Olivier, Joseph Mario Jacques Olivier
Mayors of Longueuil
Politicians from Gatineau

mg:Jacques Olivier